The Jewish-American working class consists of Jewish Americans who have a working-class socioeconomic status within the American class structure. American Jews were predominantly working-class for much of American history, particularly between 1880 and the 1930s. During this period, Ashkenazi Eastern European Jewish immigrants constituted the majority of the Jewish-American working class. By the mid-1950s, the Jewish-American community had become predominantly middle class. Stereotypes commonly depict American Jews as fundamentally upwardly mobile and middle class to upper class. Despite the "imagined norm" that American Jews are "middle-class, white, straight Ashkenazi", many Jewish Americans are working class and around 15% of American Jews live in poverty.

History

1800s and 1900s
Historically, German Jews in the United States were more affluent on average than Eastern European Jews. Between 1880 and 1924, prior to the passage of the anti-immigrant and antisemitic Immigration Act of 1924, two and a half million Jews immigrated to the United States. Many settled in New York City, especially on the Lower East Side. Radical Jewish immigrants, particularly anarchists, socialists and communists, were active in creating the Jewish American labor movement. The Jewish labor movement also shaped the lives of working-class Jewish communities in cities such as Baltimore, Boston, Chicago, and Philadelphia.

By the 1920s, the Boyle Heights neighborhood of Los Angeles was a predominantly working-class and lower-middle-class Jewish community. It was known as the Lower East Side of LA, as many Orthodox Jewish Yiddish-speaking immigrants from Russia settled in the neighborhood. The Boyle Heights Jewish community featured "a vibrant, pre-World War II, Yiddish-speaking community, replete with small shops along Brooklyn Avenue, union halls, synagogues and hyperactive politics ... shaped by the enduring influence of the Socialist and Communist parties."

By 1955, American Jews of Eastern European descent were perceived as "fundamentally middle class", having attained a similar socioeconomic status to the German Jews before them. The post-war period is often regarded as a "golden age" for American Jews, as many previously working-class Ashkenazi Jews from Eastern European backgrounds were able to move up the economic ladder into the middle class.

In the 1970s and 1980s, tens of thousands of working-class Jews, many of whom were from New York or who were Holocaust survivors, settled in South Beach, Florida. South Beach was known as the "shtetl by the bay" and had a thriving working-class Yiddish culture. As developers poured money into South Beach, the neighborhood rapidly gentrified, displacing many of the elderly and working-class Jews who lived there.

21st-century Jewish working-class
Contemporary poverty is common among Orthodox Jews, particularly within Haredi and Hasidic communities, as well as among Russian-speaking Jewish immigrants from the former Soviet Union, Jewish senior citizens, disabled Jews, and Holocaust survivors. 45% of Hasidic families in New York City live in poverty or near-poverty. During the 2000s and early 2010s, the poverty rate had doubled among Jewish New Yorkers. Brooklyn has been called "the capital of Jewish poverty in North America". Between 1991 and 2011, the numbers of impoverished Jewish households increased from 70,000 to 130,000.

The Metropolitan Council on Jewish Poverty, founded in 1972, provides services to impoverished Jewish New Yorkers. Masbia, a network of kosher soup kitchens, provides food for poor and homeless Jews throughout the city.

During the early 2000s and 2010s, the gentrification of Brooklyn greatly affected working-class Hasidim. Working-class Satmar residents suffered due to increasing rents, overcrowding, and displacement. Working-class Satmar and Hasidic community activists created HaVaad leHatsolos Vioyamsburg (Committee to Save Williamsburg), which objected to the presence of what they called the "artistn" (Yiddish for "artists") - the predominantly white, young, upper-middle class hipsters and artists living in Williamsburg. The committee recommended boycotting and shunning the hipster "artistn". Satmar leaders regarded the hipsters as morally bankrupt and economically disruptive, and worried that Hasidic youths would relate more to the hipsters than to working-class African-Americans and Puerto Ricans living in the neighborhood.

In 2022, the Jewish Federation of San Diego County launched a campaign to reduce poverty within the Jewish community of San Diego.

See also
1902 Kosher Meat Boycott
Borscht Belt
Jews without Money
Metropolitan Council on Jewish Poverty

References

External links
How My Jewish Working Class Background Taught Me About Donald Trump, The Forward

Jews and Judaism in the United States
Judaism and society
Working-class culture in the United States
Working class in the United States